Carlo Fortunato Pietro Ponti Sr.  (11 December 1912 – 10 January 2007) was an Italian film producer with more than 140 productions to his credit. Along with Dino De Laurentiis, he is credited with reinvigorating  and popularizing Italian cinema post-World War II, producing some of the country's most acclaimed and financially-successful films of the 1950s and 1960s.

Ponti worked with many of the most important directors of Italian cinema of the era, including Federico Fellini, Michelangelo Antonioni, and Vittorio De Sica, as well as many international directors. He helped launch the career of his wife, international film star Sophia Loren. He won the Academy Award for Best Foreign-Language Film for La Strada (1954) and was nominated for Best Picture for producing Doctor Zhivago (1965). In 1996, he was ascended as a Knight Grand Cross to the Order of Merit of the Italian Republic.

Career
Ponti was born in Magenta, Lombardy, where his grandfather had been mayor of the city. Ponti studied law at the University of Milan. He joined his father's law firm in Milan and became involved in the film business through negotiating contracts. Ponti attempted to establish a film industry in Milan in 1940 and produced Mario Soldati's Piccolo Mondo Antico there, starring Alida Valli, in her first notable role. The film dealt with the Italian struggle against the Austrians for the inclusion of northeastern Italy into the Kingdom of Italy during the Risorgimento. The film was successful, because it was easy to see "the Austrians as Germans" during World War II.  As a result, he was briefly jailed for undermining relations with Nazi Germany.

Ponti accepted an offer from Riccardo Gualino's Lux Film in Rome in 1941, where he produced a series of commercially successful films featuring the comedian Totò. In 1954 he had his greatest artistic success with the production of Federico Fellini's La strada. However, Fellini denied Ponti's role in its success and said that "La Strada was made in spite of Ponti and De Laurentiis". Ponti produced Boccaccio '70 in 1962, Marriage Italian Style in 1964, and Yesterday, Today and Tomorrow in 1965. He produced his most popular and financially successful film, Doctor Zhivago, in 1965; the movie was directed by David Lean. He subsequently produced three notable films with Michelangelo Antonioni, Blowup in 1966, Zabriskie Point in 1970 and The Passenger in 1974.

Personal life

Marriages
In 1946, he married Giuliana Fiastri with whom he had a daughter, Guendalina, in 1951, and a son, Alex, in 1953. While serving as a judge in a beauty contest in 1951, Ponti met a minor actress named Sofia Lazzaro (real name Sofia Villani Scicolone). He subsequently cast her in films such as Anna (1951). In 1952, his friend Goffredo Lombardo, head of production at Titanus, changed Lazzaro's name to Sophia Loren.

Five years later, Ponti obtained a Mexican divorce from his first wife and married Sophia Loren by proxy. Divorce was still forbidden in Italy, and he was informed that were he to return there, he would be charged with bigamy, and Loren would be charged with "concubinage".

Ponti co-produced several films in Hollywood starring Loren, establishing her fame. In 1960, he and Loren returned to Italy and when summoned to court, denied being married. In 1962, they had the marriage annulled, after which Ponti arranged with his first wife, Giuliana, that the three of them move to France (which at that time allowed divorce) and become French citizens. In 1965, Giuliana Ponti divorced her husband, allowing Ponti to marry Loren in 1966 in a civil wedding in Sèvres. They later became French citizens after their application was approved by then-French President Georges Pompidou.

Ponti and Loren had two sons:
 Carlo Ponti Jr. (born 29 December 1968)
 Edoardo Ponti (born 6 January 1973)

Their daughters-in-law are Sasha Alexander and Andrea Meszaros. They have four grandchildren.

Loren remained married to Ponti until his death on 10 January 2007 of pulmonary complications.

Kidnapping attempts
Two unsuccessful attempts were made to kidnap Ponti in 1975, including one involving an attack on his car with gunfire.

Smuggling charges
He was tried in absentia in 1979 for smuggling money and works of art abroad, fined 22 billion lire, and sentenced to four years in prison. Ponti did not attend the hearing, as his French nationality made him immune from extradition. He was finally cleared of the charges in 1990.

Art collection
Ponti owned works by, among others, Picasso, Georges Braque, Renoir, René Magritte (including his Lumière du pole from 1927), Salvador Dalí, Henry Moore (including his Figure from 1933), Barbara Hepworth, Giorgio de Chirico and Canaletto. His collection was renowned for containing ten works by Francis Bacon. These included examples from his early Van Gogh series, triptychs, self-portraits and pope paintings, which were rarely publicised or lent to public exhibitions. In 1977 the Bacon paintings, then valued at an estimated $6.7 million, were seized and turned over by the Italian government to the Pinacoteca di Brera in Milan; thirty-three sketches by George Grosz went to a museum in Caserta. When Ponti reached a deal with the Italian government and was cleared of the charges brought against him in 1990, he regained possession of 230 confiscated paintings. At some point, the collection is said to have been split between Ponti and Loren.

Over the years, several works have been sold privately. In 2006 two Bacon paintings that had previously been in the Ponti collection were exhibited in an exhibition at the Gagosian Gallery in London. One, a vertical composition of four self-portraits, had already been sold to the American collector Steven A. Cohen. In 2007 another pope painting by Bacon, sold by Ponti in 1991, was sold in a private deal brokered by Acquavella Galleries in New York for more than £15 million. That same year, Study for Portrait II (1956) was consigned by Loren at Christie's; it was auctioned for the record price of £14.2 million ($27.5 million).

Death
Ponti died in Geneva, Switzerland, from pulmonary complications on 10 January 2007. He was survived by his daughter Guendalina (b. 1951), and his son Alessandro (b. 1953) from his first marriage; and by his second wife, Sophia Loren, and their sons Carlo (b. 1968) and Edoardo Ponti (b. 1973).

His body rests in the family tomb in Magenta, Lombardy.

Filmography

Piccolo mondo antico (1940)
 Giacomo the Idealist (1943)
A Yank in Rome (1946)
 To Live in Peace (1947)
 The White Primrose (1947)
 Prelude to Madness (1948)
Hey Boy (1948)
 Alarm Bells (1949)
The White Line (1950)
 Her Favourite Husband (1950)
 Figaro Here, Figaro There (1950)
A Dog's Life (1950)
 The Knight Has Arrived! (1950)
Toto the Third Man (1951)
 The Steamship Owner (1951)
Europa '51 (1952)
 Brothers of Italy (1952)
 The Piano Tuner Has Arrived (1952)
 Toto in Color (1952)
 Lieutenant Giorgio (1952)
Easy Years (1953)
Le infedeli (1953)
Carosello napoletano (1954)
La strada (1954)
 The Doctor of the Mad (1954)
Mambo (1954)
Un americano a Roma (1954)
L'oro di Napoli (1954)
Attila (1954)
The Miller's Beautiful Wife (1955)
War and Peace (1956)
Il ferroviere (1956)
Guendalina (1957)
The Black Orchid (1958)
That Kind of Woman (1959)
Heller in Pink Tights (1960)
A Breath of Scandal (1960)
Two Women (1960)
Lola (1961)
A Woman Is a Woman (1961)
Léon Morin, prêtre (1961)
Cléo from 5 to 7 (1962)
Boccaccio '70 (1962)
Le Doulos (1962)
L'isola di Arturo (1962)
Redhead (1962)
The Empty Canvas (1963)
Landru (1963)
Les Carabiniers (1963)
Contempt (1963)
Yesterday, Today and Tomorrow (1963)
Marriage Italian Style (1964)
Break Up (1965)
Operation Crossbow (1965)
The 10th Victim (1965)
Doctor Zhivago (1965)
Closely Watched Trains (1965, uncredited)
Blowup (1966)
The Firemen's Ball (1967, uncredited)
Smashing Time (1967, uncredited)
La Ragazza e il Generale (1967)
Ghosts – Italian Style (1968)
Diamonds for Breakfast (1968)
Zabriskie Point (1970)
The Priest's Wife (1971)
What? (1972)
Giordano Bruno (1973) 
Torso (1973)
Dirty Weekend (1973)
Mr. Hercules Against Karate (1973)
Flesh for Frankenstein (1973)
Gawain and the Green Knight (1973)
The Voyage (1974)
The Passenger (1974)
Sex Pot (1975)
L'infermiera (1975)
Brutti, sporchi e cattivi (1976)
The Cassandra Crossing (1976)
A Special Day (1977)

Notes

References

1912 births
2007 deaths
People from Magenta, Lombardy
Italian emigrants to France
Italian film producers
Naturalized citizens of France
David di Donatello winners
Nastro d'Argento winners
University of Milan alumni
Golden Globe Award-winning producers